Potassium/sodium hyperpolarization-activated cyclic nucleotide-gated channel 1 is a protein that in humans is encoded by the HCN1 gene.

Function 

Hyperpolarization-activated cation channels of the HCN gene family, such as HCN1, contribute to spontaneous rhythmic activity in both heart and brain.

Tissue distribution 
HCN1 channel expression is found in the sinoatrial node, the neocortex, hippocampus, cerebellar cortex, dorsal root ganglion, trigeminal ganglion and brainstem.

Interactions 

HCN1 has been shown to interact with HCN2.

Epilepsy 

De novo mutations in HCN1 cause epilepsy.

See also
 Cyclic nucleotide-gated ion channel

References

Further reading

External links 
 
 
 

Ion channels